The following is a list of awards and nominations received by Angela Bassett.

Bassett is an American film, television, and stage actress who garnered critical acclaim for portraying Tina Turner in the film What's Love Got to Do with It, for which she was nominated for the Academy Award for Best Actress and won the Golden Globe Award for Best Actress – Motion Picture Musical or Comedy. She won a Golden Globe again, this time the Best Supporting Actress – Motion Picture one, for her role in Black Panther: Wakanda Forever, which also garnered her another Academy Award for Best Actress nomination. She has also received nine Emmy Award nominations to date.

Throughout her career, Bassett has appeared in several motion pictures portraying real-life women, most recently as Coretta Scott King in the television movie Betty and Coretta. This role gave Bassett her second Screen Actors Guild Award for Outstanding Performance by a Female Actor in a Miniseries or Television Movie nomination. As part of the cast of Black Panther, she would go on to win a SAG award, and would later be nominated again for her role in its sequel, Black Panther: Wakanda Forever. While mainly acting in film, she has appeared in numerous guest roles on television. She began acting in her first regular role on television during the final season of the long-running series ER. And in 2013, Bassett co-starred in American Horror Story: Coven, portraying Voodoo high priestess Marie Laveau.

Major associations

Academy Awards

BAFTA Awards

Emmy Awards

Golden Globe Awards

Screen Actors Guild Awards

Industry awards

BET Awards

Black Reel Awards

Black Reel Awards for Television

NAACP Image Awards

Satellite Awards

Critics awards

Chicago Film Critics Association

Critics' Choice Movie Awards

Critics' Choice Super Awards

Dallas-Fort Worth Film Critics Association

Hollywood Critics Association

Washington D.C. Area Film Critics Association

Miscellaneous awards

MTV Movie Awards

Saturn Awards

Capri Hollywood International Film Festival

Honors

Hollywood Walk of Fame

References

External links
 

Bassett, Angela

de:Liste von Auszeichnungen der US-amerikanischen Filmschauspielerin Angela Bassett